SQF Complex or Sequoia Complex was a complex of two of the August 2020 California lightning wildfires, burning in Sequoia National Forest and adjacent areas. Sparked on August 19, it included the Castle and Shotgun fires. As of January 5, 2021, it had burned  and was 100% contained. 228 structures were destroyed.

Fire progression 

The fire initially burned in Sequoia National Forest, Inyo National Forest, and the Golden Trout Wilderness. On 14 September, the fire crossed the boundary into Sequoia National Park.

The SQF Complex was declared 100% contained on January 6, 2021. Winter weather essentially extinguished the fire, although a sequoia tree trunk was found to be still burning in early May, 2021.

Impacts

Damage 
The small community of Cedar Slope was largely destroyed by the fire with 57 of its 65 cabins completely burned. In the nearby communities of Alpine Village and Sequoia Crest, 37 and 49 cabins were lost in the fire respectively. No structure damage was reported in nearby Camp Nelson or Ponderosa. The area remains at risk for mud flows and flash floods due to the charred soil being unable to absorb water.

Closures and evacuations 
As a result of the fire, parts of Route 190 and Route 198 were closed, Sequoia National Park was closed for two weeks  and parts of Three Rivers were under mandatory evacuation orders.

Giant sequoias 
The Castle fire swept through portions of 20 giant sequoia groves. The number of mature Sequoia Trees that died is “certainly in the hundreds – and could easily top 1,000.” More recent estimates indicate that over 7500–10,600 mature trees, or over 10-14% of the species' population, could have been lost in the fire. The most intense previous fire in this area is dated to 1297 based on tree ring data. The McIntrye Grove, a short distance to the south from Cedar Slope, is reported as heavily damaged. Near Sequoia Crest, one-third of the Alder Creek Grove of Giant Sequoia is reported as severely damaged. The large Stagg Tree in Alder Creek Grove was not impacted. Other areas experienced “light fire” which is expected to be ecologically beneficial in the long run. The Homers Nose Grove is also reported as “badly burned”.

See also 
2020 California wildfires
August 2020 California lightning wildfires
LNU Lightning Complex fires
SCU Lightning Complex fires
CZU Lightning Complex fires

References

2020 California wildfires
Sequoia National Park
Wildfires in Tulare County, California